In a non-fiction book, a conclusion is an ending section which states the concluding ideas and concepts of the preceding writing.  This generally follows the body or perhaps an afterword, and the conclusion may be followed by an epilogue, outro, postscript, appendix/addendum, glossary, bibliography, index, errata, or a colophon. Aristotle, in The Rhetoric, tells us a good writer should do this in the conclusion: "make the audience well-disposed towards ourselves and ill-disposed to our opponent." It's a good opportunity to make inferences or predictions, or to ask the audience to consider what would happen if they do not accept our point of view by making a connection to society in general.

See also 
 Addendum
 Postface
 Publishing

References

Book design
Literature